Tripuris have their own traditional dresses. This type of dress is similar to that of the rest of the North-East Indian people, but the pattern and design is totally different.

Female dresses
The dress  for women for the lower half of the body is called Rignai in Tripuri and for the upper half of the body cloth has two parts Risa and Rikutu.

Risa covers the chest part and the rikutu covers whole of upper half of the body. In the yesteryears these garments were used to be woven by the ladies by home spun thread made from the cotton, but nowadays the threads are bought from the market and the risa is not worn, instead blouse is worn by most of Tripuri women because of convenience. In present-day young girls are wearing rignai with tops also.

Rignai

Each of the clans of Tripuri has their own "rignai" pattern and design. The pattern of the "rignai" are so distinct that the clan of a Tripuri woman can be identified by the pattern of the rignai she wears. Nowadays there is inter-mingling of the 'rignai' and different clans are wearing 'rignai' of other clans freely and new designs are being woven differently. 'Rikutu' is a plain cloth of different colour and shade woven by the Tripuri ladies.

Rignai Chamathwibar
Rignai Chamathwibar is the most significant Tripuri Rignai. It is known as the mother of all Rignais as all the other Rignais had evolved from Rignai Chamathwibar.

Rignai designs
Different types of designs fashion that are woven in the rignai borok by the Tripuri women are as follows:

 Anji
 Banarosll
 Chamthwibar
 Jirabi
 Khamjang
 Khumbar
 Kuaiphang
 Kuaichu
 Kuaichu bokobom
 Kuaichu ulta
 Malibar
 Miyong
 Muikhunchok
 Monaisora
 Muisili
 Natupalia
 Phantokbar
 Sada
 Salu
 Similik yapai

 Takhumtei
 Temanlia
 Thaimaikrang
 Thaiphlokbar
 Tokbakbar
 Tokha
 Toksa
 Toiling
 Toprengsakhitung
 Rignaichamwthwi
 Rignai mereng
 Metereng trang
 Rignai khamchwi
 Kwsakwpra
 Rignaibru
 Rignaikosong
 Kwsapra
 Songkai
 Sorbangi

and many more.

It is said that at the time of Subrai Raja, the most famous and legendary King of Tripura, through his 250 wives he had invented two hundred fifty designs of rignai. He married those woman whoever invented a new design. But all these design had lost in time and only few are retained till date. The effort to re-discover the lost designs is in process.

Male costume

Male counterpart used to wear 'Duti borok' for the loin and 'Kamchwlwi borok' for the upper part of the body. But in the modern age very few people are wearing these dress except in the rural Tripura and working class. The male have adopted the modern dress of international style gaffa.

See also
 Tripuri culture

References
 

 
Dresses